Hollywood Capers is a 1935 short animated film of the Looney Tunes series.  It stars Beans the Cat in the character's second solo cartoon. Porky also made a cameo.

Plot

One day in Hollywood, actors come to the studio to do their routines - seen are W. C. Fields and Charlie Chaplin. Also coming to the studio is Beans who travels in his rough-riding car, but the guard will not permit him to enter. Not backing out, Beans disguises himself as Oliver Hardy, and passes through the gate without causing suspicion.

Taking off his cover, Beans enters a sound stage where Oliver Owl is directing a film. Looking from a catwalk, Beans watches Little Kitty perform a scene where an actor tries to court her. Suddenly, a passing worker accidentally knocks him off and Beans falls on top of the actor, much to the annoyance of Oliver, who tosses Beans away. Beans lands in a scene room where a Frankenstein-esque robot is on the table. As he frightenedly moves back, the cat lands on a switch. As a result, the robot activates and rises.

The robot goes on a rampage and everyone flees the studio. Beans tries to whack it with an iron bar but the robot is very sturdy and throws him across the sound stage. As Beans lands next to a giant fan, he switches it on, generating a gale force at the robot. The robot resists the draft, but walks straight into the fan getting smashed to bits.

Home media
The short was released on the Looney Tunes Golden Collection: Volume 3.

References

External links

Hollywood Capers at the Big Cartoon Database

1935 films
1930s American animated films
American black-and-white films
Films scored by Norman Spencer (composer)
Films directed by Jack King
Films set in Los Angeles
Looney Tunes shorts
Beans the Cat films
Porky Pig films
Animated films about cats
Cultural depictions of Charlie Chaplin
Cultural depictions of W. C. Fields